Rajah Humabon, later baptized as Don Carlos, (died April 27, 1521) was a Malay Filipino who served as the Rajah of Cebu until his death in 1521. Humabon ruled at the time of the arrival of Portuguese-born Spanish explorer Ferdinand Magellan in the Philippines in 1521. Humabon, his wife, and his subjects were the first known Catholic converts in the Philippines. 

There is no official record of Humabon's existence before the Spanish contact. The existing information was written by Magellan's Italian voyage chronicler, Antonio Pigafetta on Humabon and the indigenous Philippine peoples that existed prior to Spanish colonization.

Rajah Humabon is cited as the reason for why Magellan fought in the Battle of Mactan, as the latter wanted to earn the trust of Humabon by helping him subdue his opponent Lapulapu, the datu of Mactan.

Legendary accounts
There is no official record of the origins of Rajah Humabon prior to the arrival of Magellan. According to tradition, Humabon (also known as Sri Hamabar) was the son of Sri Bantug, and the grandson of Sri Lumay. His ancestor, Sri Lumay, a native from Sumatra and a member of the Chola Dynasty, established the Rajahnate of Cebu, and sired at least four known sons, namely Alho, Ukob, Parang the Limp, and Bantug (father of Rajah Humabon).

Sri Alho ruled a land known as Sialo which included the present-day towns of Carcar and Santander in the southern region of Cebu.

Sri Ukob ruled a kingdom known as Nahalin in the north which included the present-day towns of Consolación, Liloan, Compostela, Danao, Carmen and Bantayan. He died in battle, fighting with the tribal group known as magalos from Mindanao.

A third brother was Sri Parang the Limp, but could not rule because of his physical infirmity.

Sri Bantug, the youngest, ruled a kingdom known as Singhapala (a variation of the Sanskrit Singha-Pura, "City of the Lion", which is also the root of Singapore),
 in a region which is now part of Cebu City, who later died of disease and was succeeded by his son Sri Hamabar, also known as Rajah Humabon. Because of his infirmity, Sri Parang handed Bantug's throne to Bantug's son Humabon as regent, and Humabon became the rajah (king) of Cebu.

Spanish contact
When Sri Bantug died Sri Parang became his successor, but due to his limp he passed the throne to Humabon. The phrase Cata Raya Chita was documented by historian Antonio Pigafetta to be a warning in the Malay language, from a merchant to the Rajah. Following Pigafetta's inscription, the phrase is creole Malay for "Kata-katanya adalah raya cita-cita". The phrase may mean "What they say is mainly ambitious": kata-kata ("words"), –nya (second person possessive), adalah ("is/are"), raya (great, main, large), cita-cita ("ambitious"). Another interpretation is that the phrase was spoken by merchants under the authority of Rajah Humabon was actually the Old Malay Kota raya kita, meaning "We are of the great fortress": Kota ("fortress"), Raya ("great"), Kita ("we"). The meeting between Rajah Humabon and Enrique of Malacca, the slave accompanying Magellan's voyage, was documented by Antonio Pigafetta and Spanish explorer Miguel López de Legazpi and is evidence that Old Malay was understood in parts of what is now the Philippines.

Conversion to Catholicism, betrayal of Magellan's crew
According to historical accounts, Rajah Humabon was among the first indigenous converted to Catholicism after he, his wives, and his subjects were baptized by the expedition's priest. On April 14, 1521, Humabon was christened Carlos in honor of King Charles I of Spain, while his chief consort, Hara Humamay was given the name Juana, after Charles' mother, Joanna of Castile. He also made a blood compact with Magellan, as a sign of friendship; according to Pigafetta, it was Humabon who had requested Magellan to kill his rival, Lapulapu, the datu or chieftain of nearby Mactan Island.

After the death of Magellan at the Battle of Mactan and the consequent failure of the Spanish to defeat Lapulapu, Humabon and his warriors plotted to poison the remaining Spanish soldiers in Cebu during a feast. Several men were killed, including the then-leaders of the expedition, Duarte Barbosa and João Serrão.

According to the chronicler Pigafetta, Serrão, begging to be saved from the Cebuano tribesmen, allegedly referred to Enrique (Magellan's slave) as having instigated the massacre by claiming to Humabon that the Europeans planned to take over the rajahnate.

Historical commemoration
The Rajah Humabon monument is located at Burgos Street in Cebu City.

See also
History of the Philippines
Rajahnate of Cebu
Singhapala - ancient capital of the Rajahanate of Cebu

References

External links
Rajah Humabon – King of Cebu (PDF)
Cebu eskrima
The official website of Boholchronicle

Converts to Roman Catholicism
Filipino datus, rajas and sultans
Filipino paramount rulers
Filipino people of Malay descent
Filipino Roman Catholics
Magellan expedition
Paramilitary Filipinos
People from Cebu
People of Spanish colonial Philippines